Bistrica is a village in the municipality of Gornji Vakuf, Bosnia and Herzegovina.

It was the place of a massacre  in the Croat–Bosniak War in August 1993

Demographics 
According to the 2013 census, its population was 1,378.

References

Populated places in Gornji Vakuf-Uskoplje